Khorram Dasht Rural District is a rural district (dehestan) in Kamareh District, Khomeyn County, Markazi Province, Iran. At the 2006 census, its population was 6,360, in 1,708 families. The rural district has 29 villages.

References 

Rural Districts of Markazi Province
Khomeyn County